MPs elected in the 1708 British general election

This is a list of the 558 MPs or Members of Parliament elected to the 314 constituencies of the Parliament of Great Britain in 1708, the 2nd Parliament of Great Britain, and their replacements returned at subsequent by-elections, arranged by constituency.

The reference, in the constituency section of the table, to the numbers of seats in a constituency has no relevance except to make clear how many members were elected in a particular constituency. The candidates returned in contested elections are listed in the descending order of the number of votes received. Where vote totals are unknown, the MPs received the same number of votes or were returned unopposed the order is that given by Hayton et al.

Peers of Ireland are differentiated from the holders of courtesy titles by including the succession number to the peerage, i.e. The 1st Earl of Upper Ossory is an Irish peer and Viscount Dupplin is the holder of a courtesy title.

Elections took place in May, 1708



By-elections
 List of Great Britain by-elections (1707–15)

See also
1708 British general election
List of parliaments of Great Britain
Unreformed House of Commons

References

 The House of Commons 1690–1715, eds. D. Hayton, E. Cruickshanks, and S. Handley (2002)

External links
 History of Parliament: Members 1690–1715
 History of Parliament: Constituencies 1690–1715

1708
1708
1708 in Great Britain
List of MPs elected in the 1708 British general election